Llanfair-Mathafarn-Eithaf is a parish and community in Anglesey, Wales including the small seaside town of Benllech. The community population taken at the 2011 census was 3,382.

Local buildings include the medieval St Mary's Church, where the 18th century poet Goronwy Owen once served as curate. The parish has five Scheduled Monuments, including two collections of hut circles and the stone remains of a dolmen type Neolithic burial mound, called the Pant-y-Saer Cromlech. The remains of a Viking Age settlement have also been found in the parish.

The parish lies on an area of Carboniferous Limestone and supports a variety of wildlife, including red squirrels. The Cors Goch nature reserve is a rich fenland habitat in the west of the parish and is designated an SSSI.

Other settlements include Brynteg, Llanbedrgoch, Tyn-y-Gongl, and Red Wharf Bay.

Notable people
 Goronwy Owen (1723–1769) a notable Welsh poet
Howel Harris Hughes (1873–1956), theologian, Presbyterian minister and Principal of the United Theological College in Aberystwyth was born in the parish.

References

External links
 Llanfair Mathafarn Eithaf Community Council
 Ancient Monuments UK - Pant-y-Saer Hut Circles
 Gwynedd Archaeological Trust - description of Viking Age settlement
 Red Squirrels Trust Wales
 North Wales Wildlife Trust - Cors Goch